Rapha Performance Roadwear is a cycling lifestyle brand focused on road bicycle racing and mountain biking clothing and accessories. Rapha has their headquarters in London alongside a United States office in Bentonville, Arkansas.

History
The company was started in London in early 2004 by Simon Mottram and Luke Scheybeler. Their first products were launched in July of the same year. The name Rapha was taken from the 1960s cycling team Rapha, which was named after the apéritif drink company Saint Raphaël.

In 2007, Rapha partnered with British designer Paul Smith to create a range of limited-edition cycle clothing and accessories. In 2016, Rapha collaborated with bikepacking designer Apidura on a limited range of cycling luggage.

In August 2017, it was announced that Rapha would be purchased by RZC Investments, a company set up by Steuart Walton, for £200m.

In February 2020, Rapha announced that they would be relocating their North American headquarters from Portland, Oregon to Bentonville, Arkansas.

In the same year, Rapha collaborated with Palace Skateboards on a limited edition cycling kit for professional cycling team EF Education-EasyPost at the 2020 Giro d’Italia.

In 2021, Rapha entered the mountain bike market, launching its first range of mountain biking clothing in collaboration with Smith on a line of limited edition helmets.

Organizations and Venues 
In 2015, Rapha developed an international cycling club called the Rapha Cycling Club (RCC), whose members get exclusive benefits with the company. Today, it has over 20,000 members.

Rapha's stores are found in approximately 21 international locations throughout North America, Europe, Asia and Oceania. Rapha's stores are called "Clubhouses." Each location has a retail space, which sells Rapha-branded clothing and accessories, alongside a café area. The Rapha Cycling Club will hosts community rides and events at the store's locations. Rapha's stores also play host to a number of cycling-related events and art exhibitions throughout the year. In addition, Rapha operates mobile "Clubhouses" through Europe and the UK; venues that will travel to certain events throughout the cycling season.

The Rapha Foundation was created in 2019 by Rapha co-founder Simon Mottram and shareholders Tom & Steuart Walton to provide direct funding to various non-profit cycling organizations. The foundation's goal is to introduce cycling to a wider audience. The organization provides $1.5 million a year in funding, and supports non-profits in the UK, United States, Germany, Australia and Japan.

Sponsorships
Rapha used to co-own the UK-based cycling team  with London bike brand Condor Cycles and the cyclocross team Rapha Focus.

In August 2012, it was announced that as of 2013, Rapha would be producing the clothing for the British cycling team, Team Sky. On November 3rd, 2015, Rapha announced that their Team Sky sponsorship would end after the 2016 season.

In 2015, Rapha announced it will begin supplying clothing to the UCI Women's WorldTour team Canyon-SRAM. However, in 2022, it was announced that Canyon-SRAM would drop Rapha as their clothing outfitters. EF Education First started wearing Rapha clothing in the 2019 race season, alongside UCI Men’s WorldTour team EF Education-EasyPost. 

In 2022, Rapha became the apparel sponsor for UCI Women’s WorldTour team EF Education-Tibco-SVB.

Rapha also sponsors UCI Continental cycling teams L39ION of Los Angeles and Roxsolt Liv SRAM, and professional cyclists Lael Wilcox, Maghalie Rochette, and Sarah Sturm.

See also

Sportswear (activewear)

References

External links
 

Sportswear brands
2004 establishments in the United Kingdom
Companies based in the London Borough of Islington
Sporting goods manufacturers of the United Kingdom
Sportswear
Clothing companies established in 2004